Philip James Welch (April 4, 1895 – April 26, 1963) was a U.S. Representative from Missouri.

Born in St. Joseph, Missouri, Welch was educated in the public schools.
He engaged in the furniture business 1916–1931.
Treasurer of city of St. Joseph 1932-1936 and mayor 1936–1946.
He served as delegate to Democratic National Convention in 1940.
He served as assistant director of Reconstruction Finance Corporation, Kansas City, Missouri, in 1946 and 1947.

Welch was elected as a Democrat to the Eighty-first and Eighty-second Congresses (January 3, 1949 – January 3, 1953).
He was not a candidate for renomination in 1952 to the Eighty-third Congress but was unsuccessful for the Democratic gubernatorial nomination.
He served with the State civil defense and later with the State industrial inspection division.
He was a resident of St. Joseph, Missouri, until his death in Methodist Hospital April 26, 1963.
He was interred in Memorial Park Cemetery. St. Joseph's baseball park, Phil Welch Stadium, is named in his honor.

References

1895 births
1963 deaths
Politicians from St. Joseph, Missouri
Mayors of places in Missouri
Democratic Party members of the United States House of Representatives from Missouri
20th-century American politicians